Maeda Toshiaki may refer to:

Maeda Toshiaki I (1638–1692), daimyō of Daishōji Domain from 1660 to 1692
Maeda Toshiaki II (1758–1791), daimyō of Daishōji Domain from 1778 to 1791

See also
Maeda clan
Daishōji Domain